The Church of St. Francis Xavier is located in the Old Town of Kaunas, Lithuania. The church, dedicated to St. Francis Xavier, was built in the Town Hall Square in the Old Town of Kaunas by Jesuits. The Jesuits opened their first residence in Kaunas in 1642 and established a chapel in the House of Perkūnas in 1643. Later they also founded a first four-form school in the city in 1649. The construction of the church started in 1666 and was completed in 1720, the church was consecrated in 1722.

The Tsarist Russian government gave the church to the Orthodox church for their use in 1824. The church was again assigned to the Jesuits only in 1924. After Lithuania was occupied by Soviet Union the St. Francis Xavier church was turned into a technical school, the interior of the church was used as a sports hall. The church was returned again to the Jesuits in 1989, and renovation of the church took place in 1992.

Gallery

See also

 List of Jesuit sites

References

External links 
Kaunas St. Francis Xavier Church website

Roman Catholic churches in Kaunas
Baroque architecture in Lithuania
18th-century Roman Catholic church buildings in Lithuania
Roman Catholic churches completed in 1722
1722 establishments in Europe